Socialist Youth of Northern Rhodesia was a youth organisation in Northern Rhodesia (present-day Zambia). It was a member of the International Union of Socialist Youth.

References

Political organisations based in Zambia
Northern Rhodesia